Otto C. "Jaybird" Ray (born May 19, 1893 in Lexington, Missouri - January 19, 1976 in Liberty, Missouri) was a Catcher and Outfielder in the Negro leagues. Monarchs team mate George Carr said of Ray during the White Sox Winter League that Ray could not only catch, but could also back up first base.

Under Sol White, Ray managed the Cleveland Browns in their only season in 1924.

Ray died in Liberty, Missouri at the age of 82. He is buried at the Fort Leavenworth National Cemetery in Leavenworth, Kansas.

References

External links
 and Baseball-Reference Black Baseball stats and Seamheads

Chicago Giants players
Kansas City Monarchs players
Cleveland Browns (baseball) players
Cleveland Tate Stars players
St. Louis Stars (baseball) players
1893 births
1976 deaths
People from Lexington, Missouri
20th-century African-American sportspeople
Baseball catchers